Drummonds was a 1985 British television series set in a boarding school for boys during the mid-1950s. It was produced for the ITV Network by London Weekend Television and ran for two seasons between 1985 and 1987. It starred Richard Pasco as the school's headmaster, George Drummond and Ciaran Madden as his wife Mary..

The series was filmed at Amesbury School in Surrey, England.

External links 
 

1985 British television series debuts
1987 British television series endings
1980s British drama television series
ITV television dramas
Television series by ITV Studios
London Weekend Television shows
English-language television shows